"Sunny Sundae Smile" is a song by the alternative rock band My Bloody Valentine. It was released as a non-album single in February 1987 on Lazy Records. Recorded at Alaska Studios in London, "Sunny Sundae Smile" was the band's first release on Lazy Records and the final release to feature original vocalist David Conway.

Less than 2,000 copies of the 7-inch single were pressed and the 12-inch single received a limited release of 2,000 copies. Allmusic writer Nitsuh Abebe described "Sunny Sundae Smile" as "pop melodies revved up by sheets and sheets of Jesus and Mary Chain-style guitar noise" and added that "somewhere in there, though, you can hear the beginnings of the lighter, more distinct sound that characterized Ecstasy and 'Strawberry Wine'." Upon its release, "Sunny Sundae Smile" peaked at number 6 on the UK Independent Singles Chart.

Track listing
All songs written by David Conway and Kevin Shields.

UK 7" single (Lazy Records, LAZY04)
"Sunny Sundae Smile" – 2:30
"Paint a Rainbow" – 2:19

UK 12" single (Lazy Records, LAZY04T)
"Sunny Sundae Smile" – 2:30
"Paint a Rainbow" – 2:19
"Kiss the Eclipse" – 2:34
"Sylvie's Head" – 1:54

Personnel
All personnel credits adapted from "Sunny Sundae Smile"s liner notes.

My Bloody Valentine
David Conway – vocals
Kevin Shields – guitar, vocals
Debbie Googe – bass
Colm Ó Cíosóig – drums

Technical personnel
My Bloody Valentine – production
Steve Nunn – engineering
Pete Peterson – photography

Chart positions

Cover Versions
The Primitives released an acoustic version of Kiss the Eclipse on YouTube

References

Bibliography

External links

1987 songs
1987 singles
My Bloody Valentine (band) songs
Songs written by Kevin Shields